Matthew 12:47 is the 47th verse in the twelfth chapter of the Gospel of Matthew in the New Testament.

Content
In the original Greek according to Westcott-Hort, this verse is:
Εἶπε δέ τις αὐτῷ, Ἰδού, ἡ μήτηρ σου καὶ οἱ ἀδελφοί σου ἔξω ἑστήκασι, ζητοῦντές σοι λαλῆσαι.  

In the King James Version of the Bible the text reads:
Then one said unto him, Behold, thy mother and thy brethren stand without, desiring to speak with thee.

The New International Version translates the passage as:
Someone told him, "Your mother and brothers are standing outside, wanting to speak to you."

Analysis
This person is believed to have been the messenger whom the brothers of Christ sent to call Him out.

Commentary from the Church Fathers
Jerome: "He that delivers this message, seems to me not to do it casually and without meaning, but as setting a snare for Him, whether He would prefer flesh and blood to the spiritual work; and thus the Lord refused to go out, not because He disowned His mother and His brethren, but that He might confound him that had laid this snare for Him."

References

External links
Other translations of Matthew 12:47 at BibleHub

12:47